Roboto is a neo-grotesque sans-serif typeface family developed by Google as the system font for its mobile operating system Android, and released in 2011 for Android 4.0 "Ice Cream Sandwich".

The entire font family has been licensed under the Apache license. In 2014, Roboto was redesigned for Android 5.0 "Lollipop".

Usage
Roboto is the default font on Android, and since 2013, other Google services such as Google Play, YouTube, Google Maps, and Google Images.

In 2017, Roboto was used on the LCD countdown clocks of the New York City Subway's B Division lines.

Roboto Bold is the default font in Unreal Engine 4, and in Kodi. Roboto Condensed is used to display Information on European versions of Nintendo Switch packaging, including physical releases of games.

Utsav Network uses Roboto for its wordmark.

Since October 2022, Global News has also used Roboto in its on-air presentation, however the font is not used in main network presentation.

History

Development
The font was designed entirely in-house by Christian Robertson who previously had released an expanded Ubuntu Titling font through his personal type foundry Betatype. The font was officially made available for free download on January 12, 2012, on the newly launched Android Design website.

Compared to Android's previous system font, the humanist sans-serif Droid, Roboto belongs to the neo-grotesque genre of sans-serif typefaces. It includes Thin, Light, Regular, Medium, Bold and Black weights with matching oblique styles rather than true italics. It also includes condensed styles in Light, Regular and Bold, also with matching oblique designs.

Redesign 
In 2014, Matias Duarte announced at Google I/O that Roboto was significantly redesigned for Android 5.0 "Lollipop". Punctuation marks and the tittles in the lowercase "i" and "j" were changed from square to rounded, the bottom surface of the top part of the number "1" points downwards instead of horizontal, the tail part of the numbers "6" and "9" have been slightly shortened (in resemblance to "Trebuchet MS"), and the entire typeface was made “slightly wider and rounder” with many changes in details.

Language support 
Roboto supports Latin, Greek (partial) and Cyrillic scripts. 

On Android, the Noto font is used for languages not supported by Roboto, including Chinese (simplified and traditional), Japanese, Korean, Thai and Hindi.

Variations

Roboto Slab 

Roboto Slab is a slab serif font based on Roboto. It was introduced in March 2013, as the default font in Google's note-taking service Google Keep. (The font was changed to the sans-serif Roboto in 2018.) It is available in four weights: thin, light, regular and bold. However, no oblique versions were released for it. In November 2019, the typeface was updated and added 5 new weights: Extra-Light, Medium, Semi-Bold, Extra-Bold and Black, and a variable font axis ranging from 100 to 900. It also was modified with some characteristics from the sans-serif Roboto and to slightly resemble most slab-serif typefaces, such as "R", "K", "k", "g", "C", "S", etc.

Roboto Mono 

Roboto Mono is a monospace font based on Roboto. It is available in seven weights: thin, extra-light, light, regular, medium, semi-bold and bold, with oblique stylings for each weight.

Heebo 
Heebo is an extension of Roboto that includes Hebrew characters.

Roboto Serif 
Roboto Serif is a version of Roboto with serifs. It was debuted in 2022 to fill the serif niche.

Reception 

Google developed the font to be "modern, yet approachable" and "emotional," but Roboto received mixed reviews on its release. Joshua Topolsky, Editor-In-Chief of technology news and media network The Verge, describes the font as "clean and modern, but not overly futuristic – not a science fiction font". However, typography commentator Stephen Coles of Typographica called the initial release of Roboto "a Four-headed Frankenfont", describing it as a "hodgepodge" of different typographic styles which do not work well together.

See also 
 Cantarell
 IBM Plex
 Noto
 Segoe
 Product Sans
 San Francisco

References

External links

 Roboto, download page at Google Fonts
 Roboto Condensed, download page at Google Fonts
 Roboto Slab, download page at Google Fonts
 Roboto Mono, download page at Google Fonts
 Roboto Serif, download page at Google Fonts

Neo-grotesque sans-serif typefaces
Android (operating system)
Typefaces and fonts introduced in 2011
Open-source typefaces
Slab serif typefaces
Monospaced typefaces
Unified serif and sans-serif typeface families
Typefaces with text figures